The Texas railway line is a disused branch railway of the South Western railway line in the south of the Darling Downs region of Queensland, Australia, and was the last traditional branch line railway constructed in Queensland.

The McDougall brothers settled land in the Texas region in about 1840. They later had to prove their claim to the property after another settler moved in during their absence. At the time, the Republic of Texas in North America was in the midst of a land war with neighbouring Mexico and thus they called their property Texas station. Tobacco was grown in the Texas region along with a busy trade in rabbit meat and skins.

Between October 1910 and March 1912, a road train serviced the area between Inglewood (a railhead on the South Western line), Texas and Silver Spur.  In 1914, following an inefficient and unreliable service, a branch line was approved linking the three centres. Construction did not begin until February 1929 and the  section between Inglewood and Texas opened on 3 November 1930.  Two small sidings appeared en route at Magee and Mundoey.

Grain, tobacco, dairy products and livestock were its main cargo but the line faced stiff competition with motor transport in the ascendancy.  Closure of the Silver Spur mine sounded the death knell of an extension beyond Texas.  Two trains a week connected with services at Inglewood.  Although special trains ran during busy times, branch traffic was always sparse.   Short branch lines ran from Texas station to livestock pens and past the Texas Freezing Works where rabbits were processed.

By 1963, passenger services had disappeared from the timetable. Regular services were withdrawn in 1985 and services were replaced by motor truck.  The line closed on 1 January 1994 and is retained by Queensland Rail as a non-operational corridor. The track was left in place but other facilities were removed.

See also

Rail transport in Queensland

References

External links
 1925 map of the Queensland railway system

Railway lines opened in 1930
Closed railway lines in Queensland
Railway lines closed in 1994
Darling Downs